Plane Crazy is an airplane combat/racing video game for Microsoft Windows and Sony PlayStation in which contesting pilots race planes through 3D courses. Plane Crazy was based around arcade racers rather than flight simulation, focusing on action rather than realism. It was originally planned for release in arcades as one of the first games to use Microsoft and Intel's Windows-based arcade system. The game supported the Heat.net (Windows) and Multiplay (PlayStation) multiplayer gaming system, with up to eight players allowed in one race.

Gameplay

Plane Crazy had three game modes for PC:
"Quick Race" - Allowed you to play a single level against seven AI opponents.
"Ghost Race" - Time trial mode.
"Championship" - Expanded below.

Plane Crazy had four game modes for PS1:
"Championship"
"Extreme Championship"
"Single Race"
"Best Times"

In Plane Crazy the player pilots a fast, cartoon-like plane, built for speed across a variety of levels. The objective of each level is to reach the end as fast as possible. Planes either bounce or explode when they come into contact with other structures, terrain, or even other planes. They then respawn, invincible for a short amount of time.

There are three types of planes: the light and fast plane that cannot take much damage, the evenly balanced plane and the heavy plane which is slower but can take more punishment. Each of these planes can be upgraded and customized.

Throughout each map there are blue vortexes dotted at given locations, that give a random  upgrade/weapons to the plane. These power-ups give players an advantage over the other opponents, making game play more hectic. "Black Cat" grants invincibility for a short amount of time. "Rocket Boosts" increases the planes speed dramatically for a few seconds, depending on the rocket's level (small, large, large*3). Sometimes a player may be given a weapon which could fire a random homing missile at a random opponent in front of the plane. That player will than be sent an "Incoming!" message where the player can try to dodge the projectile. If the missile should hit, that player's plane could be temporarily disabled or plummet to the ground. Each plane is also given three blue torpedoes, which can be used to trigger environmental hazards for other players or open short-cuts.

Plane Crazy featured online play, using the Heat.net multiplayer gaming system, it allowed eight players on one server at one time.

Championship Mode
Against seven other opponents, the objective of each level is to make it to the finish before the other players do. Throughout the course there are checkpoints that give you additional time. If the player should run out of time their engine would cut out leading their plane to veer and descend. If the plane were to touch anything they would crash leading to a game over. The only way to avoid this is to reach a checkpoint before hitting an obstacle. Upon completing a level the player will be rewarded with a cash pay out for upgrading their plane, the cash reward is increased the further into the championship with the highest value being $1000.

Sometimes a bonus reward may be available, giving the player an extra cash pay out; the highest bonus pay out is $1000.

When the last race is complete the player may be given a trophy based on their position.

Level Design
All maps in Plane Crazy are linear in design and would feature shortcuts that were either already exposed or could be exposed by player interaction by using rockets, of which each player would start with 3 per map. Rockets could also be used to activate hazards that would allow the player to catch up with players ahead of them, if used effectively.

Players could also pick up blue orb that would give them items ranging from boosts and player-targeted rockets to stealth.

Levels
Border Dash - a canyon map that features short sections over water and in a town.

Dockland Dive - a map that takes place in an industrial area with sections flying through a cooling tower, through sewers and over water.

Monument Rush - a canyon map that features a couple of water sections and caves.

Volcano Rapids - a map that takes place high up in a volcano with sections flying through a jungle, over lava and water, in ancient ruins and, notably, through a waterfall.

Sin City Run - a map that takes place entirely in a neon lit city at night.

Drain Stormin (PS1 Exclusive) - a map that takes place in a series of storm drains.

Reception

The PC version received mixed reviews according to the review aggregation website GameRankings. Next Generation said, "Every now and then, a game comes along that promises to be something grand, but in reality, it stinks more than a huge pile of pig... well, you get the idea. Plane Crazy is one of those games."

See also
 SkyDrift (a similar game released in 2011)

Notes

References

External links
Sega Soft Plane Crazy website
Japanese Plane Crazy web site
Wine compatibility status

1998 video games
Air racing video games
Cancelled arcade video games
PlayStation (console) games
Sega video games
Video games developed in the United Kingdom
Windows games